Inox festival was created in 2003 by Marc TAMBON, owner of “La Dune” nightclub in Toulouse, France. The electronic music festival is famous for having hosted DJ's such as Joachim Garraud, Avicii, Sebastien Drums and many others. After the success of the festival, Inox owner created Inox club events in La Dune and changed the club's name into Club Rouge. Due to high demands, Inox Festival expended to Strasbourg in 2009. In 2010 the first Inox Park opened in Paris. The Paris Festival lasted three days and was a success. Since then, Inox has been doing worldwide festivals in places such as Rio de Janeiro.

Inox Festivals

Toulouse 
The Toulouse Inox Festival was created in May 2003. The festival has since taken place every year in "Club Rouge" located in Toulouse. Inox is a three-day electronic music festival. In 2011, the Toulouse Festival had approximately 35000 people attending.

Artists 

2005

 Carl Cox
 Sasha
 Tom Pooks
 David Guetta
 Erick Morillo
 David Moreno
 Javier Munoz
 Reche
 Didier Sinclair
 Eric Prydz
 Laurent Wolf
 Pendulum
 Verse
 NU Balance
 Le Lutin
 Miss Ficel
 Brooks
 BlackStrobe deck and EFX
 AlterEgo
 Darren Price

2006

 Carl Cox
 Jeff Mills
 Felix Da Housecat
 Deep Dish
 David Guetta
 Tom Pooks
 Booka Shade
 Bob Sinclar
 Antony
 Ricardo Villalobos
 Tania Vulcano
 Monika Kruse
 Marc Romboy
 Dirty Princess
 Digitalism
 Robbie Rivera
 Joachim Garraud
 Andrew Weatherall
 Martin Solveig
 Dj Ralf
 André Dalcan
 Greg Delon
 LTJ Bukem feat MC Conrad
 Elisa Do Brasil

2007

 Monika Kruse
 Joris Voorn
 Jeff Mills
 John Digweed
 Dave Seaman
 Nick Warren
 Jimmy Van M
 Technasia
 IorDee
 José Louis
 Martin Solveig
 Bob Sinclar
 David Vendetta
 Sven Vath
 Tekel
 Dominik Eulberg
 Steve Angello
 David Guetta
 Joachim Garraud
 Eric Prydz aka Cirez D
 Scan X
 Anthony Rother
 D'Julz
 Alex Under
 André Dalcan

2008

 David Guetta
 Joachim Garraud
 Sebastien Leger
 John Digweed
 Sasha
 Scarlett Etienne
 Samy, Charly B
 Tonio
 Greg Modi In
 Aria
 Tomstom
 Dirty B
 Squal

2009

 David Guetta
 Eric Prydz
 Bob Sinclar
 Fedde le Grand
 Martin Solveig
 Axwell
 Joachim Garraud
 Laidback Luke
 Sebastien Leger
 Dirty South
 Dj Ralf
 Sebatien Bennett
 Philippe B
 Richie Hawtin
 Dubfire
 2 Many Dj's
 Luciano
 Dj Hell
 Dave Clarke
 Boys Noize
 Marco Carola
 Agoria vs Oxia
 Dj Mehdi
 Guy Gerber
 David Carretta
 Micro Clima

2010

 David Guetta
 Dubfire
 Martin Solveig
 Chris Liebing
 Crookers
 Marco Carola
 Joachim Garraud
 Laidback Luke
 Sino Live
 Technasia & Dosem
 Antoine Clamaran
 Tocadisco
 Chukie
 Monika Kruse
 Gaiser
 Afrojack
 Zombie Nation
 Surkin
 Anja Schneider
 Bart B More
 Arno Cost
 Avicii
 Teo Moss
 Sebastien Benett
 Tristan Garner

2011

 Avicii
 Magda
 Kiko
 Carl Cox
 Tristan Garner
 David Guetta
 Sebastien Drums
 Martin Solveig
 Dj Ralf
 Moonbeam
 Umek
 Felix Kröcher
 Miss Kittin
 Stephane Bodzin
 Gaiser
 Richie Hawtin
 Joachim Garraud

Strasbourg 
After the success of several Toulouse festivals, Inox expanded northwards to Strasbourg in 2009. On the night of 14 November 2009, approximately 8000 electronic music fans participated to Strasbourg Inox festival at Salle Rhénus located in Place Foire des Expositions. Since then, electronic music fans from France and all around the world have had the opportunity every November to see some of the most world-renowned DJs. The second Strasbourg Inox festival took place in November 2010, with DJs including Laidback Luke, Joachim Garraud and Martin Solveig performing. The third Strasbourg Inox festival is to be held in November 2011.

Artists 

2009

 Bob Sinclar
 Joachim Garraud
 Antoine Clamaran
 Dj Ralf
 Luciano
 Dubfire
 Chris Liebing
 Josh Wink

2010

 Martin Solveig
 Laidback Luke
 Joachim Garraud
 Mathieu Bouthier
 Jeff Mills
 Popof
 Felix Kröcher
 Dan Ghenacia

INOX Paris Park 
The Inox Park Paris is an electronic festival lasting 12 hours. The festival takes place on l'île des Impressionnistes at Chatou (78400) every September since 2010. The 2011 edition attracted more than 12.000 spectators.

Artists 

2010

 Eric Prydz
 Bob Sinclar
 Martin Solveig
 Dubfire
 Richie Hawtin
 Jeff Mills
 Popof
 Loco Dice
 Antoine Clamaran
 Joachim Garraud
 D'Julz
 Sebastien Benett

2011
 Joachim Garraud
 Avicii
 Axwell
 Beat Torrent
 BeatauCue
 D'Julz
 Mathieu Bouthier
 Nasser
 Skrillex
 Steroe Heroes
 Steve Aoki
 Sven Väth
 Technasia
 Michael Kaiser
 Remain

2012
 Armin Van Buuren
 Laidback Luke
 Alesso
 Joachim Garraud
 Hardwell
 R3hab
 Michael Calfan
 Jidax
 Dubfire
 Steve Lawler
 Oliver Huntemann
 Popof
 Maetrik
 Steve Aoki
 Valentino Jorno
 Flux Pavilion
 Borgore
 Zedd
 Tommy Trash
 Cyberpunkers

See also

List of electronic music festivals

References

Official Website = > https://web.archive.org/web/20111026093024/http://www.inox-festival.com/
 http://www.inoxparis.com/
 https://web.archive.org/web/20111026093535/http://www.inox-festival.com/strasbourg/index.html
 http://www.inox-festival.com/2011/index.html
 https://www.theguardian.com/business/2010/aug/27/music-festivals-record-industry
 http://www.verif.com/bilans-gratuits/KL-440343465/
 http://www.verif.com/societe/KL-440343465/
 http://www.radiofg.com/rubrique/653/Inox-Festival-Toulouse/

Music festivals established in 2003
Electronic music festivals in France